Brabham may refer to:

 Brabham, Western Australia, Australia; a suburb of Perth located in the City of Swan
 Brabham (surname), and a list of people by that name

Sports
 Brabham—Motor Racing Developments, a defunct Formula One racing team
 Brabham Racing, an endurance racing sports car racing team
 Formula Brabham, an Australian open-wheel open-cockpit car racing category
 Brabham Cup, an ice hockey trophy for the North American league ECHL

Other uses
 Brabham Automotive, an Australian carmaker
 Jack Brabham (album), a 1988 album by 'The Triffids'

See also

 
 Braham (disambiguation)